Bungee jumping, also spelled bungy jumping, is an activity that involves a person jumping from a great height while connected to a large elastic cord. The launching pad is usually erected on a tall structure such as a building or crane, a bridge across a deep ravine, or on a natural geographic feature such as a cliff. It is also possible to jump from a type of aircraft that has the ability to hover above the ground, such as a hot-air-balloon or helicopter.  The thrill comes from the free-falling and the rebound. When the person jumps, the cord stretches and the jumper flies upwards again as the cord recoils, and continues to oscillate up and down until all the kinetic energy is dissipated.

Early tethered jumping 

The land diving of Pentecost Island in Vanuatu is an ancient ritual in which young men jump from tall wooden platforms with vines tied to their ankles as a test of their courage and passage into manhood. Unlike in modern bungee-jumping, land-divers intentionally hit the ground, but the vines absorb sufficient force to make the impact non-lethal. The land-diving ritual on Pentecost has been claimed as an inspiration by A. J. Hackett, prompting calls from the islanders' representatives for compensation for what they view as the unauthorised appropriation of their cultural property.

The car, seating two hundred people, would have been shoved from a platform on the tower and then would have bounced to a stop. The designer engineer suggested that for safety the ground below "be covered with eight feet of feather bedding". The proposal was declined by the Fair's organizers.

Etymology 

The word "bungee" originates from West Country dialect of the English language, meaning "Anything thick and squat", as defined by James Jennings in his book "Observations of Some of the Dialects in The West of England" published 1825. In 1928, the word started to be used for a rubber eraser. 

The Oxford English Dictionary records early use of the phrase in 1938 relating to launching of gliders using an elasticated cord, and also as "A long nylon-cased rubber band used for securing luggage".

"Bungy" is the usual spelling in New Zealand and other countries.

Modern sport 
The first modern bungee jumps were made on 1 April 1979 from the  Clifton Suspension Bridge in Bristol, England, by David Kirke and Simon Keeling, members of the Oxford University Dangerous Sports Club, and Geoff Tabin, a professional climber who tied the ropes for the jump. The students had come up with the idea after discussing the "vine jumping" ritual of Vanuatu. The jumpers were arrested shortly after, but continued with jumps in the US from the Golden Gate Bridge and the Royal Gorge Bridge. The last jump was sponsored by and televised on the American programme That's Incredible, spreading the concept worldwide. By 1982, Kirk and Keelling were jumping from mobile cranes and hot air balloons.

Colorado climbers Mike Munger and Charlie Fowler may have bungee-jumped earlier in Eldorado Springs, CO in 1977. Both were cutting-edge alpinists, preparing for a trip to Monte Fitzroy in Patagonia by simulating long falls onto a springy,  nylon climbing rope. They scrambled up to a large tree at the top of the  wall, above a severely overhanging climb  appropriately named "Diving Board", and tied one end of the rope into the tree. With a piece of flat seat belt webbing around his waist and some homemade leg loops, Mike tied into the other end of the rope and, after no small amount of trepidation, he jumped. He then ascended the rope mechanically to the tree and untied. Then Charlie tied in and jumped.

Organised commercial bungee jumping began with the New Zealander, A J Hackett, who made his first jump from Auckland's Greenhithe Bridge in 1986. During the following years, Hackett performed a number of jumps from bridges and other structures (including the Eiffel Tower), building public interest in the sport, and opening the world's first permanent commercial bungee site, the Kawarau Bridge Bungy at the Kawarau Gorge Suspension Bridge near Queenstown in the South Island of New Zealand. Hackett remains one of the largest commercial operators, with concerns in several countries.

Several million successful jumps have taken place since 1980. This safety record is attributable to bungee operators rigorously conforming to standards and guidelines governing jumps, such as double checking calculations and fittings for every jump. As with any sport, injuries can still occur (see below), and there have been fatalities. A relatively common mistake in fatality cases is to use a cord that is too long. The cord should be substantially shorter than the height of the jumping platform to allow it room to stretch. When the cord becomes taut and then is stretched, the tension in the cord progressively increases. Initially the tension is less than the jumper's weight and the jumper continues to accelerate downwards. At some point, the tension equals the jumper's weight and the acceleration is temporarily zero.  With further stretching, the jumper has an increasing upward acceleration and at some point has zero vertical velocity before recoiling upward.  See also Potential energy for a discussion of the spring constant and the force required to distort bungee cords and other spring-like objects.

The Bloukrans River Bridge was the first bridge to be used as a bungee jump launch spot in Africa when Face Adrenalin introduced bungee jumping to the African continent in 1990. Bloukrans Bridge Bungy has been operated commercially by Face Adrenalin since 1997, and is the highest commercial bridge bungy in the world.

In April 2008, a 37-year-old Durban man, Carl Mosca Dionisio, made bungee jumping history when he jumped off a  tower attached to a bungee cord made entirely of 18,500 condoms.

Equipment 

The elastic rope first used in bungee jumping, and still used by many commercial operators, is factory-produced braided shock cord. This special bungee cord consists of many latex strands enclosed in a tough outer cover. The outer cover may be applied when the latex is pre-stressed, so that the cord's resistance to extension is already significant at the cord's natural length. This gives a harder, sharper bounce. The braided cover also provides significant durability benefits. Other operators, including A. J. Hackett and most southern-hemisphere operators, use unbraided cords with exposed latex strands. These give a softer, longer bounce and can be home-produced.

Accidents where participants became detached led many commercial operators to use a body harness, if only as a backup for an ankle attachment. Body harnesses generally derive from climbing equipment rather than parachute equipment.

The highest jump 

The SkyJump did not qualify as the world's highest bungee as it is not strictly speaking a bungee jump, but instead what is referred to as a 'Decelerator-Descent' jump, using a steel cable and decelerator system, rather than an elastic rope. On 17 December 2006, the Macau Tower started operating a proper bungee jump, which became the "Highest Commercial Bungee Jump in the World" according to the Guinness Book of Records. The Macau Tower Bungy has a "Guide cable" system that limits swing (the jump is very close to the structure of the tower itself) but does not have any effect on the speed of descent, so this still qualifies the jump for the World Record.

It is located in the gorge of Kaligandaki River and world-first natural canyon bungee jump. This jump, made without guide ropes, is from the top of the Verzasca Dam near Locarno, Switzerland. It appears in the opening scene of the James Bond film GoldenEye. The Bloukrans Bridge Bungy in South Africa and the Verzasca Dam jumps are pure freefall swinging bungee from a single cord.

Guinness only records jumps from fixed objects to guarantee the accuracy of the measurement. John Kockleman however recorded a  bungee jump from a hot air balloon in California in 1989. He landed safely under parachute.

One commercial jump higher than all others is at the Royal Gorge Bridge in Colorado. However, this jump is rarely available, as part of the Royal Gorge Go Fast Games—first in 2005, then again in 2007. Previous to this the record was held in West Virginia, USA, by New Zealander Chris Allum, who bungee jumped  from the New River Gorge Bridge on "Bridge Day" 1992 to set a world's record for the longest bungee jump from a fixed structure.

Variations

Catapult 

In "Catapult" (Reverse Bungee or Bungee Rocket), the jumper starts on the ground. The jumper is secured and the cord is stretched, then released and shooting the jumper up into the air. This is often achieved using either a crane or a hoist attached to a (semi-)perma structure. This simplifies the action of stretching the cord and later lowering the participant to the ground.

Trampoline 
"Bungy Trampoline" uses elements from bungy and trampolining. The participant begins on a trampoline and is fitted into a body harness, which is attached via bungy cords to two high poles on either side of the trampoline. As they begin to jump, the bungy cords are tightened, allowing a higher jump than could normally be made from a trampoline alone.

Running 
"Bungee Running" involves no jumping as such. It merely consists of, as the name suggests, running along a track (often inflatable) with a bungee cord attached. One often has a velcro-backed marker that marks how far the runner got before the bungee cord pulled back. This activity can often be found at fairs and carnivals and is often most popular with children.

Ramp 

Bungee jumping off a ramp. Two rubber cords – the "bungees" – are tied around the participant's waist to a harness. Those bungee cords are linked to steel cables along which they can slide due to stainless pulleys. The participants bicycle, sled or ski before jumping.

SCAD diving 
SCAD diving (Suspended Catch Air Device) is similar to bungee jumping in that the participant is dropped from a height, but in this variation there is no cord; instead the participant free-falls into a net. Untrained SCAD divers use a special free fall harness to ensure the correct falling position. Free-style SCAD divers do not use harnesses. The landing into the huge airtube framed net is extremely soft and forgiving. The SCAD was invented by MONTIC Hamburg, Germany in 1997.

Risk of injury 

Bungee jumping injuries may be divided into those that occur after jumping secondary to equipment mishap or tragic accident, and those that occur regardless of safety measures.

In the first instance, injury can happen if the safety harness fails, the cord length is miscalculated, or the cord is not properly connected to the jump platform. In 1986, a man died during rehearsals for a bungee jumping stunt on a BBC television programme, because the cord sprang loose from a carabiner clip.

Injuries that occur despite safety measures generally relate to the abrupt rise in upper body intravascular pressure during bungee cord recoil. Eyesight damage is the most frequently reported complication. Impaired eyesight secondary to retinal haemorrhage may be transient or take several weeks to resolve. In one case, a 26-year-old woman's eyesight was still impaired after 7 months. Whiplash injuries may occur as the jumper is jolted on the bungee cord and in at least one case, this has led to quadriplegia secondary to a broken neck. Very serious injury can also occur if the jumper's neck or body gets entangled in the cord. More recently, carotid artery dissection leading to a type of stroke after bungee jumping has also been described.

In popular culture 
In the film GoldenEye, James Bond makes a jump over the edge of a dam in Russia (in reality the dam is in Switzerland: Verzasca Dam, and the jump was genuine, not an animated special effect). The jump in the dam later makes an appearance as a Roadblock task in the 14th season of the reality competition series The Amazing Race.

A fictional proto-bungee jump is a plot point in the Michael Chabon novel The Amazing Adventures of Kavalier and Clay.

In the film Selena, in which Jennifer Lopez plays Selena Quintanilla-Perez, her character is shown bungee jumping at a carnival. This actual event took place shortly before Selena's murder on 31 March 1995.

In Valiant (comics) #171 (January 8, 1966), the two boys from Worrag island in "The Wild Wonders" in a circus story, jump from high up and seem ready to crash to their deaths, but are stopped by elasticated ropes tied to an ankle of each one.

In the video game Aero the Acro-Bat, Aero will perform bungee jumping to obtain items like keys to open gates in a level.

See also
rope jumping, version of bungee jumping with a climbing rope

References

Further reading

External links 
 
 

 
Outdoor recreation
Jumping sports